National Geographic (also known as Nat Geo) is an Indian pay television channel owned by The Walt Disney Company India. a wholly owned by The Walt Disney Company. it's mainly telecast features non-fiction, documentaries involving nature, science, culture, and history, produced by the National Geographic Society. It broadcasts in Seven languages (English, Hindi, Kannada,  Malayalam, Telugu, Tamil and Bengali).

Shows
The channel broadcasts the following shows:

Current shows 
 Gordon Ramsay Uncharted
 Gourmet goes tribal 
 Banged Up Abroad
 India's mega kitchen 
 Airport Security Columbia
 Airport security Madrid
 India's jungle heroes
 India's incredible rescue ops 
 primal survivor: Mighty Mekong
 Airport security Rome
 Snakes SOS : Goa's wildest
 Land of the giants: wilf fish
 Airport security Peru
 Primal survivor
 Snake in the city
 Airport security Brazil
 Airport security first class
 Europe from above

Former shows 
 Taboo
 Brain Games
 Do or Die (TV Series)
 World's Weirdest
 Genius: Picasso
 Animals Gone Wild
 Animal Fight Club
 Deadly Game
 Ultimate Animal Countdown
 Animal Fight Club
 Dirty Rotten Survival
 Science of Stupid
 Combat Zone
 Mega Factories
 China Revealed
 Chain of Command
 Battle of the Beasts
 Monkey Thieves
 Investigates
 Extreme Flight

Channels

References

External links 
 Official website

Television channels and stations established in 1998
English-language television stations in India
Disney Star